The following are the national records in track cycling in Georgia maintained by the Cycling Federation of Georgia.

Men

Women

References

External links
 Official website (in Georgian) 

Georgia
Records
Track cycling
Track